Wembley is a suburb of the London Borough of Brent, England.

Wembley may also refer to:

the English national football stadium located in Wembley, London:
 Wembley Stadium, the current stadium, opened in 2007 on the site of the 1923 stadium
 Wembley Stadium (1923), the former stadium, built in 1923, demolished in 2003
 Wembley Arena, an indoor arena adjacent to Wembley Stadium
 Wembley, Western Australia, a suburb of the Australian city of Perth
 Wembley, Alberta, a town in northern Alberta province, Canada
 Wembley Fraggle, a character in the TV series Fraggle Rock and Fraggle Rock: The Animated Series